Dar Qeshlaq (also Romanized as Dār Qeshlāq; also known as Dar Gheshlagh and Dār Kushlāq) is a village in Mehraban-e Sofla Rural District, Gol Tappeh District, Kabudarahang County, Hamadan Province, Iran. At the 2006 census, its population was 266, in 57 families.

References 

Populated places in Kabudarahang County